Suordakh (Suordaax) is a rural locality (a selo), the only inhabited locality, and the administrative center of Suordakhsky Rural Okrug of Verkhoyansky District in the Sakha Republic, Russia, located  from Batagay, the administrative center of the district. Its population as of the 2010 Census was 354, down from 407 recorded during the 2002 Census.

References

Notes

Sources
Official website of the Sakha Republic. Registry of the Administrative-Territorial Divisions of the Sakha Republic. Verkhoyansky District. 

Rural localities in Verkhoyansky District